Vidarbha is an easternmost region of Indian state of Maharashtra comprising Nagpur Division and Amravati Division. It occupies 31.6% of total area and holds 21.3% of total population of Maharashtra.

Nagpur is the largest city of Vidarbha as well as in central India followed by Amravati. A total of 4 cities of Vidarbha region have municipal corporations.

List of cities 
Following is the list of top 25 cities with their populations according to 2011. District headquarters are shown in bold letters.

References

Vidarbha